Jeffrey Smith (born 28 June 1980) is an English former footballer who played as a midfielder.

He started his career with Hartlepool United in 1998, but a year he later moved on to Barrow, and shortly after Bishop Auckland. After two years at Bishop Auckland, he was signed by Bolton Wanderers. Rarely used by Bolton, he was instead loaned out to Macclesfield Town, Scunthorpe United, Rochdale, and Preston North End, before he signed permanently with Port Vale in 2004. A regular in the first team at Vale, he left after three years to sign with Carlisle United. In 2009, he joined Darlington, but only spent one season at the club. In August 2010 he moved to Belgium to play one season with Olympic Charleroi, before he returned to England with Whitby Town a year later. In July 2012, he joined Celtic Nation.

Career

Early career
Smith started his footballing career at Hartlepool United in 1998, but was released a year later in 1999 following a long-term injury. After his release, Smith joined non-League team Barrow, but played only one game before moving on to Bishop Auckland.

Bolton Wanderers
Smith's performances at Bishop Auckland were much improved and he was hailed as one of the best crossers in non-league football. In March 2001, Smith joined Football League First Division club Bolton Wanderers on a short contract deal after impressing during a week-long trial. Smith wanted to show Wanderers manager Sam Allardyce that he could make the grade in the Football League. Smith played in the final league match of the 2000–01 season, a 1–1 draw against Sheffield United.

He signed a new contract following Bolton's promotion to the Premier League, but struggled to get into the first team, playing a few League Cup matches. Smith was loaned to Macclesfield Town for two months to gain some experience in December 2001, and scored two goals in eight league games. He still struggled to get into the first team, playing in one Premier League match away to West Ham United, again the last game of the season.

In the two following seasons Smith played only a handful of League Cup and FA Cup matches and was loaned out to Scunthorpe United, Rochdale and Preston North End for brief periods at the back end of the 2003–04 season. During the three loan spells he made a combined total of just two starts and five substitute appearances, with injury also plaguing him. He was released by Wanderers in the summer.

Port Vale
In June 2004, Smith joined Port Vale on a one-year contract. He was a first team regular during his first season at the club and Vale offered Smith a new contract, which he accepted. Smith was again in and around the first team throughout the 2005–06 season, and signed a new one-year deal at the end of the campaign. Smith started the first half of the 2006–07 season very strongly, attracting interest from other clubs.

Carlisle United
In January 2007, Smith joined Carlisle United for a fee of £60,000 on a -year contract. Smith made his Carlisle début in a goalless draw at Brentford, scoring his first goal at Doncaster Rovers a week later. He was injured in a 2–1 win over Luton Town after coming on as a substitute, causing him to be replaced himself. This was his last game of the campaign. Smith was released from Carlisle at the end of 2008–09 after having played just twenty games all season, with the club narrowly avoiding relegation out of League One.

Darlington
He was signed by League Two's Darlington manager Colin Todd in June 2009. Darlington had a poor season, relegated out of the English Football League, eighteen points from safety, losing 32 of their 46 games, the team managed to score just 33 goals.

Later career
In July 2010 he went on trial at Scottish Premier League side Aberdeen, but was not offered a contract. The following month he signed a two-year contract with Olympic Charleroi of the Belgian Third Division B. After one season of football in Belgium he returned to England, and spent July 2011 on trial at Rotherham United. In November, he joined up with Whitby Town in the Northern Premier League Premier Division. Darren Williams' "Seasiders" finished the 2011–12 season in 17th place, six points above the relegation zone. In July 2012, he signed with Celtic Nation of the Northern League Division One.

Career statistics

Honours
Bishop Auckland
Durham Challenge Cup: 2001

Bolton Wanderers
Football League First Division play-offs: 2001

References

1980 births
Living people
Footballers from Middlesbrough
English footballers
Association football midfielders
Hartlepool United F.C. players
Barrow A.F.C. players
Bishop Auckland F.C. players
Bolton Wanderers F.C. players
Macclesfield Town F.C. players
Scunthorpe United F.C. players
Rochdale A.F.C. players
Preston North End F.C. players
Port Vale F.C. players
Carlisle United F.C. players
Darlington F.C. players
English expatriate footballers
Expatriate footballers in Belgium
R. Olympic Charleroi Châtelet Farciennes players
Whitby Town F.C. players
Celtic Nation F.C. players
Premier League players
English Football League players
Northern Premier League players